In molecular biology, non-protein coding RNA, upstream of F2R/PAR1, also known as NCRUPAR is a long non-coding RNA. It is located upstream of the PAR-1 gene and upregulates PAR-1 expression.

See also
 Long noncoding RNA

References

Non-coding RNA